Chehel Zari-ye Arab (also Romanized as Chehel Zar‘ī-ye ‘Arab and Chehel Zar‘ī ‘Arab; also known as Chehil Gazi and Zar‘ī-ye ‘Arab) is a village in Shabankareh Rural District, Shabankareh District, Dashtestan County, Bushehr Province, Iran. At the 2006 census, its population was 331, in 61 families.

References 

Populated places in Dashtestan County